The Canal latéral à l'Aisne is a canal in northern France, which connects the Canal des Ardennes at Vieux-lès-Asfeld to the canalised river Aisne at Condé-sur-Aisne. It runs alongside the Aisne. It has junctions with the Canal de l'Aisne à la Marne at Berry-au-Bac and with the Canal de l'Oise à l'Aisne in Bourg-et-Comin.

En route
Kilometre distances are given from east to west, and are continued along the canalised river Aisne down to the junction with the river Oise at PK 108
PK 0 Junction with Canal des Ardennes below the last lock of the latter, downstream from Vieux-lès-Asfeld
PK 10.5 Variscourt
PK 18.5 Berry-au-Bac junction, on the south side, with the Canal de l'Aisne à la Marne to Reims
PK 38.5 Right junction with Canal de l'Oise à l'Aisne in Bourg-et-Comin
PK 49 Vailly-sur-Aisne
PK 51.5 at Celles-sur-Aisne. Navigation continues in the canalised Aisne to PK108 with 7 more locks [2]

References

External links 
 River Aisne and Canal lateral à l'Aisne navigation guide; places, ports and moorings on the canal, by the author of Inland Waterways of France, Imray

 Navigation details for 80 French rivers and canals (French waterways website section)

Aisne
Canals opened in 1841